Wahyu Subo Seto (born 16 July 1993, in Surabaya) is an Indonesian professional footballer who plays as a midfielder for Liga 1 club Bhayangkara.

Club career

Bhayangkara FC
Wahyu made his debut when Bhayangkara F.C. against PS Barito Putera in first week 2016 Indonesia Soccer Championship A. Wahyu scored for the first time when Bhayangkara against Pusamania Borneo, Wahyu scored in the 32nd minutes

Personal life
Wahyu is the younger brother of Fandi Eko Utomo, who currently plays for Persebaya Surabaya. Fandi and Wahyu is the son of the legend of Persebaya Surabaya, Yusuf Ekodono who was an assistant coach of Bhayangkara

Honours

Club
Bhayangkara
 Liga 1: 2017

References

External links

1993 births
Living people
People from Surabaya
Sportspeople from East Java
Sportspeople from Surabaya
Indonesian footballers
Persebaya Surabaya players
Bhayangkara F.C. players
Liga 2 (Indonesia) players
Liga 1 (Indonesia) players
Association football midfielders